Vidya Bharati (short for Vidya Bharati Akhil Bharatiya Shiksha Sansthan) is the educational wing of Rashtriya Swayamsevak Sangh (RSS). It runs one of the largest private network of schools in India, operating 12,000 schools with over 3.2 Million students, as of 2016 and has its registered headquarters in Lucknow with a functional headquarters in Delhi and a sub-office in Kurukshetra. In the year 2020, the million lives club selected Vidya Bharati as an official member of Vanguard cohort for its contribution to school education.

History 
RSS, under the tutelage of M. S. Golwalkar established its first Gita school at Kurukshetra in 1946. But, the ban on RSS in 1948 put a damper on the spread of the Gita school model. After the ban was lifted, the first Saraswati Shishu Mandir brand school was established in Gorakhpur in 1952, by Nanaji Deshmukh.

The  Saraswati Shishu Mandir model was quickly replicated across several locations and as the number of schools increased, there arose the need of a definite management structure. Accordingly, Shishu Shiksha Prabandak Samiti, was set up to coordinate activities between these schools at the state level. Such committees were set up in Delhi, Bihar, Madhya Pradesh and Andhra Pradesh.

In 1977-78, an all-India apex body, Vidya Bharati was set up to coordinate the activities between these state committees and was headquartered in Delhi. This coincided with the Bharatiya Jan Sangh (political arm of RSS) winning the national elections, as a member of the Janata Party. Incidentally, Vidya Bharati used to have an associated National Academic Council with educationists, which enjoyed the trust of the National Council of Educational Research and Training (NCERT).

Organisation 
By the early 1990s, the network had grown to 5,000 schools and by 2003, to about 14,000 schools with 17 lakh (1.7 million) pupils. This expansion was facilitated by the growing demand for education in India and the disaffection with the state school system. As of March 2002, it had 17,396 schools, 22 lakh (2.2 million) students, over 93,000 teachers, 15 teacher training colleges, 12 degree colleges and 7 vocational and training institutions. As of 2019, there were 12,828 formal schools and 11,353 informal schools. In 2019, the formal schools had a total strength of more than 34 lakh (3.4 million) students.

Most of the Vidya Bharati schools are affiliated to the Central Board for Secondary Education or their local State Boards. Vidya Bharati-run educational programs were adopted in Madhya Pradesh as an alternate model of education when BJP was in power.

In addition to formal schools (which go by a variety of names such as Adarsh Vidhya Mandir,  etc.), Vidya Bharati also runs sanskar kendras (cultural schools) and single-teacher schools for cultural education. It controls over 250 intermediate colleges and about 25 institutions of higher education and training colleges.

Presence 
It has schools in remote areas of the north-eastern states as well as states like Kerala and Tamil Nadu where RSS does not have much influence. Particular attention is given to underdeveloped regions and regions inhabited by tribal communities. The Vidya Bharati schools are spread all over the country ranging from rural to urban areas from western ghats to north east parts of India. The schools have provided a holistic model of success for students coming from different social, economic and religious backgrounds. Shankardev Shishu Niketan which is a cluster of schools run under Vidya Bharati in north east India has produced some of the young minds coming from minority communities who topped grade 10 and won several Sanskrit essay writing competitions. The chain has over 29 state and regional committees affiliated to it, making it the largest voluntary association in India. Students in schools run by Vidya Bharati come from all religious groups. For instance, in Uttar Pradesh, more than 12,000 Muslim and Christian students study in these schools.

Funding and patronage 
Funds for this expansion have been collected through various means, including charities across the world. According to Awaaz, a London-based organisation, a significant portion of the Sewa International earthquake funds for Gujarat have been used to build RSS schools. The network also benefited from favourable allotment of land by Jana Sangh and BJP politicians. It was also helped with miscellaneous patronage by the Bharatiya Janata Party (BJP) whenever it was in power in the states or in the Centre (1999-2004).

Nanaji Deshmukh believed that the movement had turned 'materialistic', during the later phases but was not paying enough attention to recruiting high-quality teachers. The schools attract the children of urban and small-town shopkeepers and those of professional and government official families.

Ideology and Objectives
Dinanath Batra, former General Secretary of Vidya Bharati, said that they were fighting an "ideological battle against Macaulay, Marx and Madrasawadis". In comparison to which Vidya Bharati advocates "Indianisation, nationalisation and spiritualisation" of education. In the areas of study that are peripheral to the core curriculum, like physical education, music and cultural education, the institution worked out its own curriculum.

Cultural education 
In addition to the prescribed curriculum, the Vidya Bharati schools teach five extra subjects: moral education, which includes stories of heroes, songs, honesty, and personal hygiene, physical education, which includes learning to wield a stick, martial arts and yoga, music, Sanskrit and Vedic mathematics. Girls are given kanya bharati sessions where they discuss the real-world problems especially "women-centric" sensitive issues and learn how to deal with them. They are trained to become strong leaders idolizing Queen of Jhansi Lakshmibai, Sarojini Naidu, and other successful women in various fields like Kalpana Chawla, Sunita Williams, Kiran Bedi, etc.

In the morning assembly, the children are taught to pray and sing songs steeped in sanskrit and the spirit of patriotism. Assemblies and stage performances organized on Hindu festivals also serve to convey the Deshbhakti ideology. The virtual absence of non-Hindu children in the schools leads to a collective sense of Hindu identity. In the words of a Vidya Bharati commentator "dedication to the motherland with a deep Bharatiya spirit inculcates in the child the will to change his character [and] adjust his nature and programme so as to fulfill the nation's will and necessity."

The schools also use the students as conduits for spreading RSS concept of education.

State level committee
The state-level affiliate committees of Vidya Bharati go by various names, depending on the socio-political situation in each state:
 Delhi: Hindu Shiksha Samiti
 Haryana: Hindu Shiksha Samiti
 Punjab: Sarv Hitkari Shiksha Samiti
 Bihar: Vidya Vikas Samiti
 Jammu: Bharatiya Shiksha Samiti
 Jharkhand: Vananchal Shiksha Samiti, Vidya Vikas Samiti, Shishu Shiksha Vikas Samiti
 Odisha: Shiksha Vikas Samiti
 Telangana and Andhra Pradesh: Sri Saraswati Vidya Peetham
 Tamil Nadu: Vivekananda Kendra and others
 Kerala: Bharatiya Vidya Niketan
 Assam: Shishu Shiksha Samiti
 Uttrakhand : Bharatiya Shiksha Samiti
 Uttar Pradesh: Bharatiya Shiksha Samiti

See also

 Akhara
 Akshaya Patra Foundation
 Education in India
 Ekal Vidyalaya
 Gurukula
 History of education in the Indian subcontinent
 Rashtriya Swayamsevak Sangh
 Swami Lakshamanananda
 Vanavasi Kalyan Ashram

References

Other sources

 
 
 

Anti-communist organizations
Anti-communism in India 
Anti-Islam sentiment in India 
Hindu organizations
Hindu organisations based in India 
Educational organisations based in India
Sangh Parivar
Hindutva 
Hindu nationalism
1946 establishments in India
Hindu educational institutions